Nam kaeng hua chai thao is a Thai-Chinese radish soup, traditionally served with khao man kai ("chicken steamed rice"), and also often served with khao mok (Thai biryani), khao na pet (roast duck on rice), khao mu daeng (Thai char siu on rice). Different regions of Thailand tend to have different variations of the soup.

Ingredients
Ingredients typically include:
 Radish
 Ginger
 Broth from pork and/or chicken bones (vegetarian versions also exist)
 Pepper
 Coriander
 Salt
 Sugar

See also

 List of soups

References
 Appon's Thai Food

Thai soups